Tieguanyin (Standard Chinese pronunciation ) is a variety of Chinese oolong tea that originated in the 19th century in Anxi in Fujian province. Tieguanyin produced in different areas of Anxi have different gastronomic characteristics.

Name

The tea is named after the Chinese Goddess of Mercy Guanyin, Guanyin is an embodiment of Avalokiteśvara Bodhisattva. Other spellings and names include "Ti Kuan Yin", "Tit Kwun Yum", "Ti Kwan Yin", "Iron Buddha", "Iron Goddess Oolong", and "Tea of the Iron Bodhisattva". It is also known in its abbreviated form as "TGY".

Legends

There are two legends behind this tea: Wei and Wang.

Wei legend
In Fujian's Anxi County, there was a run-down temple which held an iron statue of Guanyin, the Bodhisattva of Compassion. Every day on the walk to his tea fields, a poor farmer named Wei would pass by and reflect on the temple's worsening condition. “Something has to be done,” he thought.

Being poor, Wei did not have the means to repair the temple. One day, he brought a broom and some incense from his home. He swept the temple clean and lit the incense as an offering to Guanyin. "It's the least I can do," he thought to himself. And he did this twice a month for many months.

One night, Guanyin appeared to him in a dream, telling him of a cave behind the temple where a treasure awaited. He was to take the treasure and share it with others. In the cave, the farmer found a tea shoot. He planted it in his field and nurtured it into a large bush, from which the finest tea was produced. He gave cuttings of this rare plant to all his neighbors and began selling the tea under the name Tieguanyin, Iron Bodhisattva of Compassion.

Over time, Wei and all his neighbors prospered; the run-down temple of Guanyin was repaired and became a beacon for the region. From this time onwards Mr. Wei took joy in the daily trip to his tea fields, never failing to stop in appreciation of the beautiful temple.

Wang legend
Wang was a scholar who accidentally discovered the tea plant beneath the Guanyin rock in Xiping. He brought the plant back home for cultivation. When he visited the Qianlong Emperor in the 6th year of his reign, he offered the tea as a gift from his native village. The emperor was so impressed that he inquired about its origin. Since the tea was discovered beneath the Guanyin Rock, he decided to call it the Guanyin tea.

Processing of Tieguanyin tea

The processing of Tieguanyin tea is complex and requires expertise. Even if the tea leaf is of high raw quality and is plucked at the ideal time, if it is not processed correctly, its true character will not be shown. This is why the method of processing Tieguanyin tea was kept a secret.

 plucking tea leaves
 sun withering
 cooling
 tossing
 withering, this includes some oxidation.
 fixation
 rolling
 drying

After drying some teas go through the added processes of roasting and scenting.

Varieties

By roasting level:
 Jade Tieguanyin (lightly baked Tieguanyin) is a newer type of Tieguanyin developed in the 1990s and has a light green jade color. It produces a very flowery aroma and taste. It is more similar to green tea than Oolong.
 Thoroughly baked Tieguanyin is the original style. It has a more complex taste profile and warm aroma, but the traditional baking technique has not been passed on well, so quality ones of this style are less seen in the market than "moderately baked" and "lightly baked" versions.
 Moderately baked Tieguanyin is a new breed that some argue has a good balance of floral aroma and complex taste, but it stores poorly.
By harvest time:
 Spring Tieguanyin is harvested around Li Xia (Start of Summer) and has the best overall quality.
 Autumn Tieguanyin is harvested in the autumn and has strong aroma but less complex taste.
 Summer Tieguanyin is harvested in summer and is considered lower-quality. Summer Tieguanyin can be further divided into two types: one harvested in June to July, one harvested in August.
 Winter Tieguanyin is harvested in winter. Production of Winter Tieguanyin is very low.
Other categories:
 Guanyin Wang (Guanyin "King") is the best of Jade Tieguanyin and Autumn Tieguanyin.

Types
Based on the different roasting methods and locations, there are various types of Tieguanyin.

Anxi Tieguanyin Tea – Recently, this oolong is typically close to a green tea, with only a little oxidation. With a very flowery and fresh delicate aroma character, the tea liquid is golden yellow. In the past, the tea was traditionally more heavily roasted.
Muzha Tieguanyin Tea – This traditional oolong is roasted and has a stronger taste and with roast nutty character; the tea liquid is reddish brown.

In Taiwan, the name Iron Goddess Tea is also used to describe a type of oolong tea that is roasted using the Iron Goddess Tea method, regardless of the type of tea leaves used.  Therefore, Taiwanese Iron Goddess Tea could be made with Iron Goddess Tea leaves, or without.

Market value
The top varieties of Tieguanyin rank among the most expensive tea in the world, with one variety reportedly sold at around 3000 USD per kilogram.  According to one source, it set the record for most expensive tea ever sold in the United Kingdom. However, that variety of Tieguanyin did not outsell a rarer Da Hong Pao oolong, which is the most expensive tea sold on the global market.

See also 
 List of Chinese teas

References 

Oolong tea
Chinese tea grown in Fujian
Cultivars of tea grown in China